is a Japanese manga series written and illustrated by Hato Hachiya. It was serialized in the monthly  manga magazine  since 2018.

Plot
A princess and her knight, Sir Harold, vow to be reunited after they reincarnate, as the difference in their social statuses cannot allow them to be together. In present-day Japan, the princess has reincarnated as Yuko Himemiya, a 39-year-old Japanese woman. One day, she reunites with Sir Harold's reincarnation, only to find out that he's a 17-year-old high school student named Haru. The two may be together again, but they must face a new set of issues regarding their relationship.

Media

Manga
We Swore to Meet in the Next Life and That's When Things Got Weird! is written and illustrated by Hato Hachiya, who originally posted it on their social media accounts. It is serialized in the monthly manga magazine  The chapters were later released in 3 bound volumes by Ichijinsha under the Zero-Sum Comics imprint.

In February 2020, Seven Seas Entertainment announced that they had acquired the manga for North American distribution in English.

Reception
Rebecca Silverman from Anime News Network praised the comic's artwork and romance, while still acknowledging the age gap between Yuko and Haru. At the same time, she claimed that the age gap will alienate some readers.

References

External links
 

2018 manga
Ichijinsha manga
Fiction about reincarnation
Romantic comedy anime and manga
Seven Seas Entertainment titles
Shōjo manga